Pauly (minor planet designation: 537 Pauly) is a minor planet orbiting the Sun.

References

External links 
 
 

Background asteroids
Pauly
Pauly
DU:-type asteroids (Tholen)
19040707